Anemia is a genus of ferns. It is the only genus in the family Anemiaceae in the Pteridophyte Phylogeny Group classification of 2016 (PPG I). Alternatively, the genus may be placed as the only genus in the subfamily Anemioideae of a more broadly defined family Schizaeaceae, the family placement used in Plants of the World Online . Its species are sometimes called flowering ferns, but this term is more commonly applied to ferns of the genus Osmunda. Fronds are dimorphic; in fertile fronds, the two lowermost pinnae are highly modified to bear the sporangia.

Ferns in this genus have chromosome numbers based on x=38: n=38, 76, 114.

Taxonomy
The genus Anemia was first described by the Swedish botanist Olof Swartz in 1806. The family Anemiaceae was created by Johann Link in 1841. In the Pteridophyte Phylogeny Group classification of 2016 (PPG I), Anemia includes Mohria and Colina and is the only genus in the family. Some sources do not separate the family Anemiaceae from Schizaeaceae.

Species

             }}
           }}
         }}
       }}
     }}
   }}
}}
}}

, Plants of the World Online accepted the following species:

 subgenus Anemia
Anemia affinis Baker
Anemia alfredi-rohrii Brade
Anemia andersonii Mickel & Labiak
Anemia angolensis Alston
Anemia antrorsa Mickel
Anemia aspera (Fée) Baker
Anemia australis (Mickel) M.Kessler & A.R.Sm.
Anemia ayacuchensis Mickel
Anemia barbatula Christ
Anemia bartlettii Mickel
Anemia blackii Brade
Anemia blechnoides Sm.
Anemia brandegeei Davenp.
Anemia buniifolia (Gardner) T.Moore
Anemia candidoi Brade
Anemia cipoensis Sehnem
Anemia collina Raddi
Anemia costata Sehnem
Anemia damazii Christ
Anemia dardanoi Brade
Anemia delicatula Mickel
Anemia dentata Gardner
Anemia denticulata Mickel
Anemia × didicusana L.D.Gómez
Anemia diversifolia Schrad.
Anemia donnell-smithii Maxon
Anemia dregeana Kunze
Anemia duartei Brade
Anemia elaphoglossoides Mickel
Anemia elegans (Gardner) C.Presl
Anemia eriodes Mickel
Anemia × espiritosantensis Brade
Anemia eximia Taub.
Anemia familiaris Mickel
Anemia ferruginea Kunth
Anemia flexuosa (Sav.) Sw.
Anemia gardneri Hook.
Anemia glareosa Gardner
Anemia gomesii Christ
Anemia guatemalensis Maxon
Anemia hatschbachii Sehnem
Anemia herzogii Rosenst.
Anemia heterodoxa Christ
Anemia hirsuta (L.) Sw. – hairy flowering fern
Anemia hirta (L.) Sw. – streambank flowering fern
Anemia imbricata Sturm
Anemia incisa Schrad.
Anemia intermedia Copel. ex M.E.Jones
Anemia irwinii Mickel
Anemia jaliscana Maxon
Anemia karwinskyana (C.Presl) Prantl
Anemia labiakii Mickel
Anemia lanata Mickel
Anemia lancea Christ
Anemia lanipes C.Chr.
Anemia lanuginosa Bongard
Anemia laxa Lindm.
Anemia lindsaeoides Mickel
Anemia luetzelburgii Rosenst.
Anemia madagascariensis C.Chr.
Anemia mandiocana Raddi
Anemia marginata Mickel
Anemia × mexiae L.S.Rabelo & Schwartsb.
Anemia mickelii L.S.Rabelo & Schwartsb.
Anemia millefolia Gardner
Anemia mirabilis Brade
Anemia multiplex Mickel
Anemia munchii Christ
Anemia mynsseniana Mickel
Anemia myriophylla Christ
Anemia nana Baker
Anemia nervosa Pohl
Anemia nicaraguensis Mickel
Anemia nigerica Alston
Anemia oblanceolata Mickel
Anemia oblongifolia (Cav.) Sw.
Anemia obovata Maxon
Anemia organensis Rosenst.
Anemia ouropretana Christ
Anemia pallida Gardner
Anemia palmarum Lindm.
Anemia × paraphyllitidis Mickel
Anemia pastinacaria Moritz ex Prantl
Anemia patens Mickel & Labiak
Anemia perrieriana C.Chr.
Anemia phyllitidis (L.) Sw.
Anemia pinnata Sehnem
Anemia pohliana Sturm
Anemia porrecta Mickel
Anemia × promiscua L.S.Rabelo & Schwartsb.
Anemia pubescens Mickel & Labiak
Anemia pulchra Pohl
Anemia pumilio Mickel
Anemia pyrenaea Taub.
Anemia raddiana Link
Anemia rauhiana Mickel
[[Anemia recondita|Anemia × recondita]] MickelAnemia repens RaddiAnemia retroflexa BradeAnemia rigida SehnemAnemia rosulata MickelAnemia rotundifolia Schrad.Anemia rutifolia Mart.Anemia salvadorensis Mickel & SeilerAnemia schaeferi SehnemAnemia schimperiana C.PreslAnemia × semihirsuta MickelAnemia × semihispida L.S.Rabelo & Schwartsb.Anemia sertaneja Mickel & LabiakAnemia sessilis (Jeanp.) C.Chr.Anemia simii TardieuAnemia simplicior (Christ) MickelAnemia smithii BradeAnemia spicantoides Mabb.Anemia tenella (Cav.) Sw.Anemia tenera PohlAnemia tomentosa (Sav.) Sw.Anemia trichorhiza GardnerAnemia tripinnata Copel.Anemia ulbrichtii Rosenst.Anemia ulei ChristAnemia underwoodiana MaxonAnemia villosa Willd.Anemia warmingii PrantlAnemia wettsteinii ChristAnemia × zanonii Mickel
 subgenus Anemirhiza
Anemia abbottii Maxon
Anemia adiantifolia (L.) Sw. – pine Fern
Anemia alternifolia Mickel
Anemia aurita Sw.
Anemia cicutaria Kuntze – hemlock fern
Anemia colimensis Mickel
Anemia coriacea Gris.
Anemia cuneata Kuntze
Anemia mexicana Klotzsch – Mexican flowering fern
Anemia portoricensis Maxon – Puerto Rican flowering fern
Anemia speciosa C.Presl
Anemia voerkeliana Duek
Anemia wrightii Baker – Wright's flowering fern
 subgenus Mohria
Anemia caffrorum (L.) Christenh.
Anemia lepigera (Baker) Christenh.
Anemia marginalis (Sav.) Christenh.
Anemia mohriana Christenh.
Anemia nudiuscula (J.P.Roux) Christenh.
Anemia saxatilis (J.P.Roux) Christenh.
Anemia vestita (Baker) Christenh.

References

C.Michael Hogan. 2010. Fern. Encyclopedia of Earth. eds. Saikat Basu and C.Cleveland. National Council for Science and the Environment. Washington DC.

Schizaeales
Fern genera
Taxa named by Olof Swartz